The Mitchell River is a tributary of the Quesnel River, approximately  long, near the eastern boundary of British Columbia, Canada. It originates in glaciers in the northern Columbia Mountains and flows generally southwest through Mitchell Lake into Quesnel Lake, and its water eventually travels down the Fraser River to the Pacific Ocean. Almost half of its course is flooded in natural lakes.

References

Rivers of British Columbia
Kootenay Land District